Abdulkarimovo (Äbdelkärim) is a rural locality (a village) in Abdrashitovsky Selsoviet of Alsheyevsky District, Bashkortostan, Russia. The population was 68 as of 2010. There are 2 streets.

Geography 
Abdulkarimovo is located 41 km southeast of Rayevsky (the district's administrative centre) by road. Balkan is the nearest rural locality.

Ethnicity 
The village is inhabited by Bashkirs and others.

References 

Rural localities in Alsheyevsky District